WMGA (97.9 FM, "The River") is an adult contemporary formatted broadcast radio station licensed to Kenova, West Virginia, serving Huntington, West Virginia, Ironton, Ohio, and Ashland, Kentucky. WMGA is licensed to Fifth Avenue Broadcasting Company, Inc.

History
On July 26, 2012, WMGA changed their format from soft AC (as "Magic 97.9") to hot AC, branded as "Hits 97.9". On May 6, 2017, WMGA changed their format to "80s and More! Hits 97.9" On February 26, 2018, WMGA changed their format from 1980s hits to adult contemporary, branded as "97.9 The River".

References

External links
97.9 The River Online

MGA
Mainstream adult contemporary radio stations in the United States